Gernon is a surname. It may refer to the following notable people:

 Billy Gernon, American college baseball coach
 Edward Gernon (1800–1877), Wisconsin state senator
 Irvin Gernon (born 1962), English footballer
 Luke Gernon (c. 1580–c. 1672), Irish judge
 Ranulf de Gernon, 4th Earl of Chester (1099–1153), Anglo-Norman potentate
 Robert L. Gernon (1943–2005), American jurist
 Thomas Gernon (born 1983), Irish academic

See also
 Gernon Bay